Lieutenant Colonel Augustus Charles Newman,  (19 August 1904 – 26 April 1972) was a British Army officer and recipient of the Victoria Cross, the highest award for gallantry in the face of the enemy that can be awarded to British and Commonwealth forces.

Details
Newman was educated at Bancroft's School, Essex. On leaving school he joined a firm of Civil Engineering and Public Works Contractors and was commissioned into the part-time Territorial Army in 1925, rising to the rank of major by 1939.

He was 37 years old and a lieutenant colonel in The Essex Regiment, British Army, attached to No. 2 Commando during the Second World War, when the following deed took place for which he was awarded the Victoria Cross (VC).

On 28 March 1942 in the attack on St. Nazaire, France, Lieutenant Colonel Newman was in charge of the military forces and he was one of the first ashore, leading his men and directing operations quite regardless of his own safety. Under his inspiring leadership the troops fought magnificently and held vastly superior numbers of the enemy at bay until the demolition parties had done their work. The colonel then attempted to fight through into open country and not until all the ammunition was spent were he and his men overwhelmed and taken prisoner.

Subsequent career
After the Second World War, Newman continued in the Territorial Army, subsequently commanding 21 (Artists) Special Air Service Regiment. He served as Deputy Lieutenant of Essex, 1946 to 1948. On 1 October 1959 he was appointed Major in the Engineer and Railway Staff Corps. 

His VC is on display in the Lord Ashcroft Gallery at the Imperial War Museum, London.

References

External links
Location of grave and VC medal (Kent)
HMS Campbeltown and the Raid on St. Nazaire (detailed description of the action)
British Army Officers 1939–1945

1904 births
1972 deaths
Burials in Kent
British Army Commandos officers
British Army personnel of World War II
British World War II recipients of the Victoria Cross
Chevaliers of the Légion d'honneur
Deputy Lieutenants of Essex
Engineer and Railway Staff Corps officers
Essex Regiment officers
Officers of the Order of the British Empire
People educated at Bancroft's School
People from Chigwell
Recipients of the Croix de Guerre 1939–1945 (France)
Special Air Service officers
World War II prisoners of war held by Germany
British Army recipients of the Victoria Cross
Military personnel from Essex